Sumeth Chandima (born 18 August 1989) is a Sri Lankan cricketer. He made his List A debut for Hambantota District in the 2016–17 Districts One Day Tournament on 26 March 2017.

References

External links
 

1989 births
Living people
Sri Lankan cricketers
Hambantota District cricketers